Tharsis is a village that is part of the Alosno municipality in the province of Huelva, Spain. According to the 2013 census, the village has a population of 1,840 inhabitants.

Mining
Tharsis is a mining town where the Filón Sur Mine, known for its fine goethite specimens, is located.

Filon Sur Mine

See also
Alosno
Tharsis Sulphur and Copper Company Limited

References

External links

Amigos de Tharsis

Populated places in the Province of Huelva